Paul van Vianen or  Paulus Willemsz van Vianen (1570–1614) was a silversmith, medallist and sculptor of the Northern Netherlands, trained in Northern Mannerism but then important in developing the Baroque auricular style with his brother Adam van Vianen.

Biography

Vianen was born in Utrecht.  According to the RKD he travelled to Italy and only moved to Prague in the last decade of his life, but for that reason he is known as a member of the Prague school of art under Rudolf II, Holy Roman Emperor. He was the son of Willem van Vianen, brother of Adam van Vianen, the father of Paulus II, and the uncle of Adam II and his brother Christian van Vianen.

His works include the 1613 Diana and Actaeon bowl, now in the Rijksmuseum in Amsterdam. Besides his work as a medallist and sculptor, he was also a landscape draughtsman and created several drawings of allegorical scenes in pastoral landscapes.  He died in Prague.

Works

References

External links
Paulus van Vianen on Artnet

Dutch medallists
Dutch silversmiths
1570 births
1614 deaths
Dutch Baroque sculptors
Mannerist sculptors
Artists from Utrecht
17th-century Dutch artists